Lickershamn is a small settlement and fishing village situated in Stenkyrka on the Swedish island of Gotland.

The place is most noted for the rauks in the area, including Gotland's largest rauk the Jungfrun ("The Maiden"). 
One of the asteroids in the asteroid belt, 10103 Jungfrun, is named after it.

Gallery

References 

Populated places in Gotland County